Alexander of Courland (18 October 1658 – 28 June 1686), nicknamed "Alexander the One-armed", was a Baltic German prince and the brother of Duke Frederick (II) Casimir of Courland. He was the youngest son of Jakob Kettler (1610–1682), Duke of Courland and his wife Luise Charlotte von Brandenburg (1617–1676), eldest daughter of Prince elector Georg Wilhelm von Brandenburg. He was a member of the Kettler dynasty.

Alexander served as an Oberst in a regiment of the Brandenburg-Prussian Army. On 26 July 1686, he was mortally wounded in the second siege of Buda during the Ottoman wars and died shortly afterwards near Vienna.

References 

1658 births
1686 deaths
People from the Duchy of Courland and Semigallia
Baltic-German people
German princes
Prussian Army personnel
17th-century Latvian people